El Salvador competed at the 2014 Summer Youth Olympics, in Nanjing, China from 16 August to 28 August 2014.

Medalists
Medals awarded to participants of mixed-NOC (Combined) teams are represented in italics. These medals are not counted towards the individual NOC medal tally.

Equestrian

El Salvador qualified a rider.

Rowing

El Salvador was given a boat to compete by the tripartite committee.

Qualification Legend: FA=Final A (medal); FB=Final B (non-medal); FC=Final C (non-medal); FD=Final D (non-medal); SA/B=Semifinals A/B; SC/D=Semifinals C/D; R=Repechage

Swimming

El Salvador qualified three swimmers.

Boys

Girls

Triathlon

El Salvador qualified two athletes based on its performance at the 2014 American Youth Olympic Games Qualifier.

Individual

Relay

Wrestling

El Salvador qualified one athlete based on its performance at the 2014 Pan American Cadet Championships.

Girls

References

2014 in Salvadoran sport
Nations at the 2014 Summer Youth Olympics
El Salvador at the Youth Olympics